Nkɔ is a Plateau language of Nigeria.

References

Blench (2008) Prospecting proto-Plateau. Manuscript.

Ninzic languages
Languages of Nigeria